The 2001 South American Race Walking Championships were held in Cuenca, Ecuador, on October 27–28, 2001.   The track of the Cup runs in the Avenida España, Parque Calderón.
The event was held jointly with the 2001 Pan American Race Walking Cup. The results for the 20 km races (both men and women) were extracted from the Pan American Race Walking Cup results, while the South American Race Walking Championships additionally featured separate races for men in 35 km, and for junior and youth athletes (both men and women).

Results were published (35 km only in part).  The junior events are documented on the World Junior Athletics History webpages.

Medallists

Results

Men's 20km

Team 20km Men

Men's 35km

Men's 10km Junior (U20)

Team 10km Men Junior (U20)

Men's 10km Youth (U18)

Team 10km Men Youth (U18)

Women's 20km

Women's 10km Junior (U20)

Team 10km Women Junior (U20)

Women's 5km Youth (U18)

Team 5km Women Youth (U18)

Participation
The participation of at least 76 athletes from 6 countries is reported.

 (3)
 (14)
 (5)
 (6)
 (37)
 (11)

See also
 2001 Race Walking Year Ranking

References

South American Race Walking Championships
South American Race Walking Championships
Walking
South American Race Walking Championships
October 2001 sports events in South America